Bandeirantes, Paraná is a municipality in the state of Paraná in the Southern Region of Brazil.

Notable people
Diego Luiz Dedoné, footballer

See also
List of municipalities in Paraná

References

Municipalities in Paraná